Scopula coenona  is a moth of the family Geometridae. It was described by Alfred Jefferis Turner in 1908. It is endemic to Australia.

References

Moths described in 1908
coenona
Endemic fauna of Australia
Moths of Australia